Thomas Jenkins  (born 1877) was a Welsh international footballer. He was part of the Wales national football team, playing 1 match on 22 February 1902 against Ireland.

See also
 List of Wales international footballers (alphabetical)

References

1877 births
Welsh footballers
Wales international footballers
Place of birth missing
Date of death missing
Association footballers not categorized by position